Chorku is a village and jamoat in northern Tajikistan. It is part of the city of Isfara in Sughd Region. The jamoat has a total population of 37,065 (2015). The Hazrati Shoh mausoleum in Chorku is from the 8th-10th century.

In August 2015, a dispute over a water canal in the area became a controversy between Kyrgyz and Tajiks.

References

Populated places in Sughd Region
Jamoats of Tajikistan